Oxyptilus insomnis is a moth of the family Pterophoridae. It is known from Kenya.

The larvae feed on Tinnea aethiopica.

References

Oxyptilini
Moths of Africa
Plume moths of Africa
Moths described in 1956